St. Michael's Churchyard is the church and graveyard located in Mickleham, Surrey, England, belonging to the Church of England parish of Mickleham.

History
The church building dates back to the Norman period from 950 to 1180, but some changes to the building were made in 1823, 1842, 1872 and 1891.

Notable burials
There are 867 recorded burials, but more are accounted for since 1891, not including those from 950 to 1891. The graveyard is the final resting place of
 Philippa Walton (1674/5–1749), businesswoman and gunpowder factory owner
 Thomas Grissell (1801–1874), public works contractor
 Anne Manning (1807–1879), novelist
 Maria Kinnaird (1810–1891), widow of Thomas Drummond.
 Trevor Lawrence (1831–1913), had famous orchid houses at Burford Lodge in the parish. He was the grandfather of Cyril Hare's wife.
 Richard Bedford Bennett (1870–1947), Prime Minister of Canada and a member of the House of Lords. Bennett's grave is located steps from the front of the church doors and has a marker from the Government of Canada signifying the important figure buried there.
 John Norton-Griffiths (1871–1930), "Empire Jack", the driving force behind the Tunnelling companies of the Royal Engineers in WW1, was buried here on 18 October 1930.
 James Jeans (1877–1946), physicist, astronomer, mathematician
 Graham Gilmour (1885–1912), pioneer aviator. Killed in a plane crash in Richmond Park.
 Cyril Hare (1900–1958), detective story writer, who was born in Mickleham Hall in 1900 and died at Westhumble in the parish in 1958.
 Janet Gladys Aitken (1908–1988), socialite
 John Junor (1919–1997), controversial editor of the Sunday Express and The Mail on Sunday.

References

External links
 

Churchyards in England
Buildings and structures in Surrey